Rubén Sánchez León (born August 21, 1973) is a Mexican retired professional boxer. He is the former WBO flyweight champion.

Professional career
In June 1996, Rubén won the World Boxing Board Flyweight Championship by beating veteran Jose Alfredo Jimenez.

He also took WBA Fedecentro Flyweight Championship after a twelve round fight with champion Miguel Martinez.

WBO Flyweight Championship
On August 14, 1998 Sánchez León won the WBO Flyweight Championship by upsetting Argentina's Carlos Gabriel Salazar with an eighth round T.K.O. in Mexicali, Baja California, Mexico.

See also
List of Mexican boxing world champions
List of WBO world champions
List of flyweight boxing champions

References

External links

Boxers from Baja California
Sportspeople from Mexicali
World boxing champions
World Boxing Organization champions
World flyweight boxing champions
Flyweight boxers
1973 births
Living people
Mexican male boxers